Johannes Søbøtker (9 May 1777 – 23 March 1854) was a Danish merchant, planter and colonial administrator who served as of St. Thomas and St. John in the Danish West Indies. His former country house Øregård in Hellerup now serves as an art museum.

Early life and education

Johannes Søbøtker was born on St. Croix in  the Danish West Indies, the son of planter and later General War Commissioner Adam Levin Søbøtker (1753–1823) and Susanne van Beverhoudt (1761–1811). His father owned the estates Constitution Hill and Høgensborg on Saint Croix and was for a while the largest landowner on the islands. Søbøtker was sent to Copenhagen where he received a commercial education first in De Coninck & Co. and later his future father-in-law Lars Larsen's trading house.

Career in Copenhagen and the Danish West Indies

He was granted citizenship as a merchant and began trading on the Danish West Indies with his own fleet of merchant ships under the name Søbøtker & Co.. In 1804, Søbøtker became a partner in Vilhelm Duntzfelt's trading house, Duntzfelt & Co.

He moved to the Danish West Indies and in 1821, he sold the house in Hellerup. When his father died in 1823 on St. Croix, he inherited the plantations, Constitution Hill and Høgensborg. In 1835, when Peter von Scholten was appointed to Governor General, he took over the position as governor of St. Thomas. He introduced the first steam mill in the Danish West Indies on his plantation Høgensborg.

Personal life and legacy

Søbøtker married Johanne Margrethe Larsen on 2 March 1796. He constructed the country house Øregård in 1806. The house was designed by Joseph-Jacques Ramée. He was known for his extravagant life style. He ran into economic problems. In 1848, Søbøtker returned to Copenhagen. He died in Frederiksberg on  23 March 1854. He is buried at Assistens Cemetery.

He became kammerherre 1830, Knight of the Order of the Dannebrog in 1826, Dannebrogsmand and finally Commander of the Order of the Dannebrog in 1837. His former country house Øregård opened as a museum in 1821. The park is also open to the public. Søbøtkers Allé, located a few streets from the park, is named after him.

References

External links

 Johannes Søbøtker at geni.com
 Source
 Source

1777 births
1854 deaths
19th-century Danish businesspeople
Businesspeople from Copenhagen
Danish planters
Danish slave owners
Danish sugar plantation owners
People from the Danish West Indies